Michael Weinrath (born 1957) is Professor and the founding Chair (having served from 2004 to 2012) of Criminal Justice and Interdisciplinary Criminology at the University of Winnipeg. Weinrath is relatively unique among criminologists for he is a former practitioner with Alberta Correctional Services in institutional and community corrections.  Weinrath brings an experiential component to his work in criminology.  Weinrath is a noted expert in penal populism, tazermetrics, and other modern technologies of correctional practice such as panopticism and actuarial risk management of dangerous populations.
 
In 2013, Weinrath became the inaugural Director of the Justice Research Institute (JRI) at the University of Winnipeg. In 2014, Weinrath was appointed Visiting Lecturer in the School of Criminology & Criminal Justice at Griffith University in Australia where he worked on sabbatical.

Weinrath is an oft quoted expert commentator with the Canadian Broadcasting Corporation. He also comments on crime issues for the Winnipeg Free Press, The Uniter and Winnipeg Sun newspapers, and local and national television media including Global Winnipeg and CTV Winnipeg.

Specialisation
Weinrath's research speciality is corrections, and he also does work in research methods, program evaluation, victimization and fear of crime, drug courts and drunk driving. He is working on a book manuscript on prison life and prison gangs in Canada in the 21st century.  He has worked as a consultant to Alberta and Manitoba Corrections and the federal Correctional Service of Canada.  Recently, he has written about the growth of Criminal Justice as a discipline in Canada, and the Canadian consensus that criminal justice is the logical disciplinary home for criminology.

Canadian Criminal Justice History
Weinrath was the architect of the first post-secondary program in Criminal Justice in Manitoba when the discipline first emerged from Manitoba's post-secondary sociology program. Weinrath was convinced that the study of institutions of justice should be approached through interdisciplinary approaches and advocated that the study of justice institutions required sociological, legal, geographical and psychological interrogation. As he built the discipline from the ground up, he used these pillars of academic interrogation to build a department and to ground the emerging discipline.

Education
Weinrath was secondary educated at Mission High School in British Columbia.  He holds a Bachelor of Arts in Criminology from Simon Fraser University, a Master of Arts in Criminal Justice from Washington State University.  He was admitted to a PhD in 1997 from the University of Alberta with a doctoral thesis entitled Concerned Drunk Driving.

References

External links
University of Winnipeg bio 

Living people
Canadian criminologists
People from Winnipeg
1957 births